Pizarra is a town and municipality in the province of Málaga, part of the autonomous community of Andalusia in southern Spain. The municipality is situated approximately 30 kilometres from Málaga. It is located in the center of the province and belongs to the comarca of Valle del Guadalhorce.

The town is served by the Málaga Metropolitan Transport Consortium Metropolitan bus lines.

References

External links
 Official website
 Málaga Metropolitan Transport Consortium Website

Municipalities in the Province of Málaga